Dan Anderson may refer to:

 Dan Anderson (psychologist) (1921–2003), American psychologist
 Dan Anderson (basketball, born 1943), American ABA basketball player
 Dan Anderson (basketball, born 1951), American NBA basketball player
 Dan Anderson (voice actor) (born 1954), voice of Dad Asparagus in Christian series VeggieTales

See also
 Daniel Anderson (disambiguation)
 Dan Andersson (1888–1920), Swedish poet